The Nimelen is a river in Khabarovsk Krai, Russia.

The Nimelen flows across a desolate, uninhabited area where the climate is harsh.

Course
The Nimelen is a left tributary of the Amgun. It has its origin in the eastern slopes of the Yam-Alin, at the confluence of mountain rivers Mata and Seyamni-Makit. In the upper course the river flows roughly southeastwards within a narrow valley in the area of the Yam-Alin. The river channel is rocky, with frequent rapids.  

After leaving the mountain area, the Nimelen flows first northeastwards across the Nimelen-Chukchagir Lowland and its valley expands. The river then bends and flows roughly southwards, while it meanders and divides into branches within a wide floodplain with marshes and numerous lakes. Finally it meets the Amgun  to the northeast of imeni Poliny Osipenko, the capital of the Imeni Poliny Osipenko District,  from the Amgun's mouth in the Amur.

Tributaries 

Flora and fauna
The vegetation cover of the Nimelen basin is poorer in comparison with other areas of the region.

Lenok, taimen, grayling, Common bream, carp, burbot, Amur pike and crucian carp are among the fish species found in the waters of the Nimelen river.

See also
List of rivers of Russia

References

External links 

Rivers of Khabarovsk Krai
Drainage basins of the Sea of Okhotsk